Kareem Rhouila, better known as Stylah, is a South London rapper from Greenwich, London. He described himself as a black Arab, half Omani and half Moroccan. After being interested in music for some time, he decided to pursue it seriously. His first offering, 2004's Prince of Thieves, has single-handedly sold 9000 copies of on the streets of London and other cities sprung one single called "Warfare Part II" featuring Serious.

Prince of Thieves caused a huge buzz for Stylah. He was soon recruited as the final piece of the jigsaw for London-based underground hip-hop group, the Poisonous Poets which consists of Lowkey, Tony D, Therapist, Doc Brown, Reveal, DJ Snips and Stylah. He is also a member of the international Catch 22 network started by Kool G Rap, which includes Immortal Technique, Ruff Ryders producer Elite, Scram Jones, Lowkey, DJ Snips, and many more.

Stylah released the mixtape Crash Course with DJ Snips in 2006 and took the same approach as his first CD by selling it straight to the streets with his Street Team, including distributor D Raw. The CD was also on sale in HMV and Virgin Megastores. With this mixtape, Stylah toured up and down the country many times, doing shows and promoting his CD. It has had many reviews that have outlined Stylah's ability to better the original songs that he features on. Quotes can be seen on Stylah's Myspace.

In 2009 due to label delays with his album, Stylah decided he needed to release another mix CD to keep the audience's attention and released The Warning hosted by celebrity gangster Dave Courtney – the CD was available for free download.

Stylah was scheduled to release his debut album Treading Water in 2010. He has also featured on many UK songs to create a bigger buzz before the release. He had many offers by record labels for his album, but so far has not signed any deal. Two songs from Treading Water were leaked before release. UK producer Chemo confirmed songs on the album; Poisonous Poets DJ Snips produced a song called "Free", and S-Type is said to have produced three tracks on the album. Another song, titled "Them Boys" produced by Australia's Styalz Fuego and featuring New York City rapper Grafh, was confirmed for Treading Water.

References

External links
Stylah's HipHopGameUK Interview 
Stylah's UKHH Interview 
Stylah's Myspace 
Poisonous Poets' Myspace 
Stylah's Rapnews Interview 

English male rappers
People from Greenwich
People from Hammersmith
Rappers from London
Year of birth missing (living people)
Living people